Surat Presidency of the East India Company which existed from 1608 to 1687. The presidency was established with the founding of an East India Company factory in the western Indian port city of Surat and was terminated when the presidency's seat was moved to Bombay. At its height, the Presidency included all factories on the west coast of India, including Ahmadabad, Balasore (1655–84), Bombay (1665–87), Hooghly (1655–84). From 1655 to 1684, the president of the Surat factory also exercised his authority over Madras.

See also 

List of tourist attractions in Surat
Surat Railway Station
Surat Airport
Surat BRTS
Surat Metro
Surat Metropolitan Region

References
 
 

British East India Company
History of Surat